Ane Santesteban González (born 12 December 1990) is a Spanish racing cyclist, who rides for UCI Women's WorldTeam . She has competed in the women's road race at the UCI Road World Championships on ten occasions between 2009 and 2022, and the road race at the Olympics in 2016 and 2020.

Major results
Source: 

2012
 3rd Road race, National Road Championships
2013
 1st  Road race, National Road Championships
2015
 2nd Road race, National Road Championships
 6th Overall Tour Cycliste Féminin International de l'Ardèche
 6th Overall Giro della Toscana Int. Femminile – Memorial Michela Fanini
2016
 5th Grand Prix de Plumelec-Morbihan Dames
 9th Overall Gracia–Orlová
 9th Durango-Durango Emakumeen Saria
 10th Overall Tour Femenino de San Luis
2017
 3rd Road race, National Road Championships
 4th La Classique Morbihan
 6th Durango-Durango Emakumeen Saria
2018
 1st  Basque rider classification, Emakumeen Euskal Bira
 2nd  Road race, Mediterranean Games
 3rd Grand Prix de Plumelec-Morbihan Dames
 5th Durango-Durango Emakumeen Saria
 5th Giro dell'Emilia Internazionale Donne Elite
 6th Overall Women's Tour de Yorkshire
 9th Overall Giro Rosa
 9th Overall Giro della Toscana Int. Femminile – Memorial Michela Fanini
 9th La Course by Le Tour de France
2019
 3rd Emakumeen Nafarroako Klasikoa
 4th Grand Prix de Plumelec-Morbihan Dames
 5th Overall Tour Cycliste Féminin International de l'Ardèche
 7th Overall Giro della Toscana Int. Femminile – Memorial Michela Fanini
 8th Overall Emakumeen Euskal Bira
1st  Basque rider classification
 9th La Course by Le Tour de France
2020
 1st  Mountains classification, Setmana Ciclista Valenciana
 2nd Road race, National Road Championships
 7th Overall Giro Rosa
 9th Clasica Femenina Navarra
 10th Durango-Durango Emakumeen Saria
2021
 2nd Road race, National Road Championships
 3rd Overall Tour Cycliste Féminin International de l'Ardèche
 9th Emakumeen Nafarroako Klasikoa
 9th Durango-Durango Emakumeen Saria
2022
 2nd Navarra Elite Classics
 2nd GP Ciudad de Eibar
 6th Overall Challenge by La Vuelta
 6th Emakumeen Nafarroako Klasikoa
 9th Overall Vuelta a Burgos Feminas
 10th La Flèche Wallonne Féminine

See also
2014 Alé Cipollini season

References

External links

 

1990 births
Living people
Spanish female cyclists
Competitors at the 2018 Mediterranean Games
Cyclists from the Basque Country (autonomous community)
People from Errenteria
Cyclists at the 2016 Summer Olympics
Cyclists at the 2020 Summer Olympics
Olympic cyclists of Spain
Mediterranean Games silver medalists for Spain
Mediterranean Games medalists in cycling
Sportspeople from Gipuzkoa
21st-century Spanish women